Gerald Chukwuma  (born 1973) is a Nigerian visual artist, sculptor and painter.

Early life and education 
Chukwuma was born in 1973 in Lagos State, Nigeria. He attended the University of Nigeria, Nsukka where he studied Bachelor of Arts degree in Fine and applied arts, he graduated in 2003.

Exhibitions

Selected solo exhibitions 

 2017: Standing Ovation, Gallery 1957, Accra
 2019: Wrinkles, Kristin Hjellegjerde Gallery, London
 2020: Ikwokirikwo: The Dance of Spirits, Kristin Hjellegjerde Gallery, Berlin
 2021: Eclipse of the Scrolls, Kristin Hjellegjerde Gallery (London Bridge), London

Selected group exhibitions 

 2021: Travels with Herodotus-A Journey through African Cultures, Galleria Bianconi, Milano
 2020: Enter Art Fair, with Kristin Hjellegjerde Gallery, Copenhagen Untitled art San Francisco, with Kristin Hjellegjerde Gallery, San Francisco
 2016: People's Paradise, Temple Muse, Lagos
 2006: With a Human Face, Pan African University, Lagos

References 

Nigerian artists
Living people
1973 births
University of Nigeria alumni